Kalkan-e Nesar (also Romanized as Kalkān-e Nesār) is a village in Horr Rural District, Dinavar District, Sahneh County, Kermanshah Province, Iran. At the 2006 census, its population was 97, in 26 families.

References 

Populated places in Sahneh County